Dezső Németh (1 September 1975, Szeged) is a Hungarian psychologist and cognitive neuroscientist at Eötvös Loránd University in Budapest and research team leader in Lyon Neuroscience Research Center (CRNL) at Claude Bernard University Lyon 1. 

Dezső Németh graduated from the Endre Ságvári High School, in 1994, Szeged. He learned psychology at the Eötvös Loránd University, 1994–1999. He graduated in 1999. He worked as a visiting professor at the Department of Neuroscience of Georgetown University (Washington DC) in 2007-2008 and in 2011-2012 at University of Texas, Austin (Russell Poldrack's Lab). He worked at the University of Szeged, Hungary (1999-2012). He works currently in the Institute of Psychology at Eötvös Loránd University (2012-present).

Németh obtained his PhD at ELTE (Budapest, 2005), habilitation at University of Pécs (Pécs, 2011) and DSc at Hungarian Academy of Sciences (Budapest, 2018).

Awards 
 Mérei Ferenc Award (2005)
 MTA Bolyai Research Fellowship (2007)
 Hungarian State Eötvös Scholarship (2007)
 Certificate of Appreciation (Pro Scientia, teacher) (2009)
 Master Teacher Gold Medal (2011)
 Kardos Lajos Commemorative Medal (Institute for Psychology, Hungarian Academy of Sciences, 2016)

See also
Cognitive Science and Neuropsychology Program of Szeged
Institute of Psychology (Szeged)

References 

 A lélektan 80 éves története a szegedi egyetemen. = The Institute of Psychology at the University of Szeged is 80 years old (1929–2009) / ed. by Ágnes Szokolszky; authors Szokolszky Ágnes, Pataki Márta, Polyák Kamilla et al. Szeged, JATEPress, 2009. 302 p. Dezső Németh see 243-245. p. 
 From Hungarian Wikipedia

External links 

 MEMO Team  - Lyon
 Neuroscience of Implicit Cognition and Learning: Current Theories and Methods, Symposium, Wednesday, Nov 19, 2014, 1:30 PM - 4:00 PM
 Psychology Today Scott Barry Kaufman:  Blogs Beautiful Minds Musings on Intelligence and Creativity in Society; July 26, 2010
 Dezső Németh, in New Scientist, 2009

Hungarian psychologists
1975 births
Living people